El Correo Gallego is a Galician newspaper founded in Ferrol, Spain, by José María Abizanda in 1878. In 1938 its owner, Juan Sáenz-Díez García, moved the daily to Santiago de Compostela; since then the paper has been headquartered there. The publisher of the daily is Editorial Compostela S.A.

See also
El Ferrol Diario

References

External links
 Official website

1878 establishments in Spain
Daily newspapers published in Spain
Mass media in Ferrol, Spain
Mass media in Santiago de Compostela
Publications established in 1878
Spanish-language newspapers